Vanna or Vannøya is a rocky island in Karlsøy Municipality in Troms og Finnmark county, Norway. At , Vanna is the 17th largest island in Norway by area. The population of the island (2017) is 799. Vannvåg and Vannareid are the two main population centres on the island. Sengskroken Church is located on the western coast of the island.

The islands of Nordkvaløya and Helgøya lie to the west of the island, and Nord-Fugløya and Arnøya lie to the east of it. Karlsøya, Reinøya, and Ringvassøya are located to the south of the island. There is ferry service to Karlsøya and Ringvassøya departing from the village of Skanningen on the southern tip of Vanna.

See also
List of islands of Norway

References

Karlsøy
Islands of Troms og Finnmark